Sir Andrew Orr (1801–1872) was a Scottish wholesale stationer who served as Lord Provost of Glasgow from 1854 to 1857.

Life
He was born in Glasgow in 1801 the son of Francis Orr, originally a pocket book maker at 15 Princes Street but later the founder of Francis Orr & Sons stationers.

He became a town councillor in 1842 and was elected Lord Provost in 1854. He was knighted by Queen Victoria
in 1858. During his term in office, he lived at 5 Blythswood Square, previously the home of Dr John Burns. Orr's neighbours included the Smith family, including the accused murderess Madeleine Smith.

From 1849 to 1871 he was also Chairman of the Glasgow and South Western Railway Company.

He retired to Harviestoun Castle near Dollar, Clackmannanshire which he had bought in 1859 together with Castle Campbell.

He was painted by Sir Francis Grant in 1871.

He died at Bridge of Allan on 19 April 1872. His wife and infant child predeceased him.

References

1801 births
1872 deaths
Lord Provosts of Glasgow
Businesspeople from Glasgow
Scottish knights
Wholesalers
Stationers (people)
19th-century Scottish businesspeople